Lakhish Regional Council (Mo'atza Azorit Lakhish) is a regional council in the Southern District of Israel. It surrounds the ancient city of Lakhish and the modern city of Kiryat Gat. It was founded in 1955. Today it includes 15 moshavim and one village, as listed below.  As of 2008, three new communities are being built in eastern Lakhish, and some old communities are being expanded. Rabbis Shabtai Ben Hayyim and Ya'akov Alkabetz serve as rabbis of the council.

List of villages
The following villages are subject to the council. All are moshavim except Bnei Dekalim, Eliav and Neta.
Ahuzam
Amatzia
Bnei Dekalim
Haruv
Lakhish
Menuha
Nir Hen
Nehora
Neta
Noga
Otzem
Sde David
Sde Moshe
Shahar
Shekef
Tlamim
Yad Natan
Zohar

External links
 

 
Regional councils in Israel
1956 establishments in Israel